Naz Elmas (born 16 June 1983) is a Turkish actress.

Biography 
Naz Elmas was born in Istanbul on 16 June 1983. Her mother is a teacher and her father works in advertising. Her sister, Açelya Elmas, who is 6 years older than her, is also an actress. In 2001, she graduated from Özel Kalamış Lisesi and went to Yeditepe University to study theatre.  

Her debut is with guest role in hit series "Gülbeyaz". In 2004, she played a lead role in Andaç Haznedaroğlu's hit series Haziran Gecesi. In the same year, she made her film debut with supporting role in the Cem Yılmaz franchise sci-fi comedy film G.O.R.A.. She joined hit medical series Doktorlar. Her period roles are in detective series Filinta and "Ustura Kemal" based from comic book.

Filmography

References

External links
 

1983 births
Living people
Actresses from Istanbul
Turkish film actresses
Turkish television actresses
Yeditepe University alumni